Angela Leighton, FBA (born 23 February 1954) is a British literary scholar and poet, who specialises in Victorian and twentieth-century English literature. Since 2006, she has been a Senior Research Fellow at Trinity College, Cambridge. Previously, from 1979 to 2006, she taught at the University of Hull, rising to be Professor of English.

Early life and education
Leighton was born on 23 February 1954 in Wakefield, Yorkshire, England, to the composer Kenneth Leighton and Lydia Leighton (née Vignapiano). She studied at St Hugh's College, Oxford, and graduated with a Bachelor of Arts (BA) degree in 1976 and a Master of Letters (MLitt) degree in 1981.

Academic career
In 1979, Leighton joined the English Department of the University of Hull. She was a lecturer from 1979 to 1993, a senior lecturer from 1993 to 1995, Reader in English from 1995 to 1997, and Professor of English from 1997 to 2006. In 2006, she moved to the University of Cambridge where she is a Senior Research Fellow of Trinity College, Cambridge.

Honours
In 2000, Leighton was elected a Fellow of the British Academy (FBA), the United Kingdom's national academy for the humanities and social sciences. She delivered the 2002 Warton Lecture on English Poetry.

Selected works

Scholarly works

Poems

References

1954 births
Living people
British academics of English literature
Academics of the University of Hull
Fellows of Trinity College, Cambridge
Fellows of the British Academy
People from Wakefield
Alumni of St Hugh's College, Oxford